{{Speciesbox
| image = Nauplius smithii.jpg
| image_caption = 
| status = CR
| status_system = IUCN3.1 
| status_ref = 
| genus = Asteriscus
| species = smithii
| authority = (Webb) Walp.
| synonyms = 
Bubonium smithii (Webb) HalvorsenNauplius smithii (Webb) A. WilklundOdontospermum smithii Webb
}}Asteriscus smithii is a species of flowering plants of the family Asteraceae. The species is endemic to the island of São Nicolau, Cape Verde. It is listed as critically endangered due to its very restricted area of occupancy and its low population size. Its local name is macela-de-gordo.

DescriptionAsteriscus smithii grows in the shape of a tuft, up to 0.8 m height. It produces a large number of small yellow flowers.

Distribution and ecologyAsteriscus smithii'' occurs only in a small area on the island of São Nicolau at higher elevation (900–1300 m) near Monte Gordo.

References

Further reading

smithii
Endemic flora of Cape Verde
Flora of São Nicolau, Cape Verde